Athrips fagoniae is a moth of the family Gelechiidae. It is found on the Canary Islands and in North Africa (Algeria, Libya, Tunisia, Egypt) and Jordan.

The wingspan is about 15 mm. The forewings are buff, with a slight rosy tinge. The hindwings are shining pale grey. Adults are on wing from December to April and in early June.

The larvae have been recorded feeding on Fagonia glutinosa and Fagonia sinaica. They spin loose webs along the trailing stems and upon the ground beneath or the rocks behind them.

References

Moths described in 1904
Athrips
Moths of Africa
Moths of the Middle East